Eleanor Shaw Milleville (1922-1991) was a noted twentieth-century American sculptor.  Milleville was born in February 1922.  A graduate of Simmons College (Massachusetts), she was known for her realistic sculptures in bronze.  Her completed works include:
 Roberto Clemente bronze relief, Pittsburgh, Pennsylvania
 “Heather” at Children's Hospital, Pittsburgh, Pennsylvania.  Heather was modeled after the artist's daughter who died at a young age.
 Memorial Plaque for Howard Bowman Stewart at Round Hill Park, Pennsylvania.
 Heroic portraits in relief at EQT Plaza, Pittsburgh, of Woodrow Wilson and Thomas G. Masaryk, in honor of the founding of the nation of Czechoslovakia.
 “A Prayer for Peace” at Fox Chapel Presbyterian Church, Pittsburgh, Pennsylvania.
Milleville died in O'Hara Township, Pennsylvania, on Tuesday, January 15, 1991.

References

1922 births
1991 deaths
Simmons University alumni
20th-century American sculptors